Tennis Club Borac (Serbian Cyrillic: Тениски клуб Борац) is the first tennis club established at Banja Luka, the second largest city in Bosnia and Herzegovina. The club has 6 tennis courts (4 outdoor and 2 in tennis hall). Nowadays, there are over 150 boys and girls from year 7 to 12 training in the club.

The Club hosted matches with Serbian players Nenad Zimonjić and Janko Tipsarević. Also, they co-organized match between Novak Djokovic and Viktor Troicki.

References

External links
 
Official website 
Sport association Borac 
Tennis clubs data base 

Sport in Banja Luka